The 2022–23 season is the 103rd season of East Bengal Football Club and their third season in the Indian Super League. The Indian football season started in August. The club competed in the Durand Cup and got eliminated in the group stage, and finished fourth in the Calcutta Football League. The club will also participate in the Indian Super League and the Super Cup.

Background 

The partnership between investor group Shree Cement and East Bengal Club was terminated after the end of the 2021–22 Indian Super League season and they returned the sporting rights back to the club on 12 April 2022, after both the parties failed to reach an agreement and the final term sheet was not accepted and signed by the club officials. The club officials, however, stated that East Bengal club shall continue to play in the Indian Super League, and shall be announcing their new investors within the next two weeks. East Bengal Club was once again handed another transfer ban by AIFF for non-payment of dues for seven of their players.

On 25 May, East Bengal announced the collaboration with Emami as the principal investors of the club. The club confirmed their participation in the 2022-23 Indian Super League season with the arrival of the new investors. On 18 July, after two months of contractual discussions between the club and the investor group, the club finally started the recruitment process for the new season after receiving a go-ahead from the investors. On 22 July, the AIFF uplifted the transfer ban set on East Bengal and thus allowed the club to register their new signings for the season. East Bengal appointed Santosh Trophy winning Kerala football team coach Bino George as the head coach of the East Bengal Reserves team, who would participate in the Calcutta Football League, and would also serve as the assistant coach of the first team for the Indian Super League. East Bengal also roped in former India national football team coach Stephen Constantine as the new head-coach of the team for the season. On 2 August 2022, the formal launch of Emami East Bengal was held in Kolkata and the tie-up between the club and the investor group Emami was officially announced. The club and the investor group formed a new company named "Emami East Bengal Pvt. Ltd." where the club would hold 23% share while 77% would be in the hands of Emami group. The club would officially play as 'East Bengal FC' in the upcoming season in the Indian Super League.

Transfers

Incoming

Loan in

Outgoing

Team

First-team squad
 The below list contains the names and details of the first team squad for East Bengal. This list does not contain the players of the reserve team which will be participating in the Calcutta Football League. On 6 October, ahead of the Indian Super League campaign, East Bengal announced the list of captains for the season – Cleiton Silva, Souvik Chakrabarti, Sumeet Passi, Kamaljit Singh and Iván González.

New contracts

Promoted from Reserve Squad

Reserve squad

The East Bengal Reserves team, who are not registered in the Indian Super League squad, would be participating in the 2022 Calcutta Premier Division with head coach Bino George taking charge of the team from the sidelines.

Current technical staff 
East Bengal appointed former India national football team coach Stephen Constantine as the head coach of the team. The club also appointed Santosh Trophy winning Kerala football team coach Bino George as the assistant coach and also shall serve as the head coach of the reserve team that will be participating in the Calcutta Football League. The club appointed Owain Manship as the head of sports science. The club also appointed former Charlton Athletic goalkeeper Andy Petterson as the goalkeeping coach for the team. East Bengal appointed Englishman Sam Baker as the video analyst of the team. The club also roped in former Sarpsborg coach Thórhallur Siggeirsson as the assistant coach of the team. On 2 November 2022, East Bengal announced that they have signed former India national under-20 football team coach Shanmugam Venkatesh as the new assistant coach of the team and Bino George would continue as the head coach of the reserves team.

Kit 
East Bengal had launched their new home and away kits before the Durand Cup. Their new kit partners Trak-Only launched the home and away kits on their social media handle ahead of the first game of the season. However, before the Indian Super League season began, the club launched the official kits for the season in gala style at the Rajdanga Naba Uday Sangha Durga Puja ground, on 29 September, with first team players – Souvik Chakrabarti, Cleiton Silva and V. P. Suhair unveiling the kits to the media, in presence of head coach Stephen Constantine.

Indian Super League Kits

Durand Cup Kits

Pre-season
On 4 August, newly appointed head coach Stephen Constantine arrived in Kolkata and started the pre-season training with the team, joined by the already announced Indian squad at the club ground. Constantine is assisted by Bino George, who also started the pre-season training with the reserve team. After his first training session with the team, Constantine put out a statement saying, "You are not going to want to play against East Bengal". On 11 August, East Bengal announced the signing of three more Indian players, including custodian Kamaljit Singh from Odisha in a hefty transfer after East Bengal agreed to pay the release clause for the goalkeeper. On 12 August, East Bengal announced the signing of five foreign players for the season: three Brazilians — Alex Lima, Cleiton Silva and Eliandro, Spanish defender Ivan González and Cyprus national team defender Charalambos Kyriakou.

East Bengal played their first pre-season friendly game on 16 August against Diamond Harbour at the Naihati Stadium. The club mainly fielded their reserve side along with three members of senior squad as the game ended in a goalless draw. After the Durand Cup exit and as preparation for the Indian Super League, East Bengal played a closed-door friendly against George Telegraph on 18 September at the AIFF National Centre of Excellence and won 3–0 with goals from Naorem Mahesh Singh, V. P. Suhair and Eliandro. On 22 September, East Bengal played Aryan in their second pre-season friendly game before the Indian Super League and won 3–0 again, with Alex Lima, Eliandro and Semboi Haokip scoring for the team. On 25 September, East Bengal played their third friendly match against India under-20 at the AIFF National Centre of Excellence and won 2–0 with goals from Sumeet Passi and Cleiton Silva. On 30 September, East Bengal played Real Kashmir in their fourth friendly game and won 3–0, with Cleiton Silva, Sumeet Passi and Souvik Chakrabarti scoring for the team, thus ending the pre-season for East Bengal before the start of the Indian Super League.

Pre-season friendlies

Competitions

Overall record

Durand Cup

East Bengal will be participating in the 2022 Durand Cup after being absent in the previous two editions of the tournament. East Bengal was drawn in group B alongside ATK Mohun Bagan, Mumbai City, Rajasthan United and Indian Navy. East Bengal began their campaign on 22 August against Indian Navy at the Salt Lake Stadium. In the opening game, East Bengal played out a goalless draw against the Indian Navy and settled for one point. East Bengal faced Rajasthan United in the second game of the group on 25 August at the Kishore Bharati Krirangan and once again settled for a goalless draw. Goalkeeper Kamaljit Singh saved a penalty in the second half to keep the clean sheet as East Bengal managed two points from as many games in the group. East Bengal faced ATK Mohun Bagan in their third game of the group on 28 August at the Salt Lake Stadium and suffered a 0–1 defeat courtesy of an own goal from Sumeet Passi in the dying minutes of the first half. After ATK Mohun Bagan won their fixture against Indian Navy on 31 August, East Bengal were officially eliminated from the tournament with a game to play. In the final game of the group stage, East Bengal ended their campaign with their first victory of the season, as they defeated Mumbai City 4–3 at the Kishore Bharati Krirangan on 3 September. Sumeet Passi and Cleiton Silva scored a brace each for East Bengal while Lallianzuala Chhangte got a brace and Greg Stewart scored the other for Mumbai in a seven-goal thriller win for East Bengal.

Group stage

Matches

Indian Super League

Summary 
The 2022-23 Indian Super League will be played across the country in home and away formats after two seasons of hosting it in Goa due to the COVID-19 pandemic. The fixtures were released on 1 September with the league set to begin on 7 October 2022; with East Bengal featuring in the opening fixture against Kerala Blasters away at Kochi. On 5 October, East Bengal announced their 27-man squad for the Indian Super League, that included six foreign players lead by coach Stephen Constantine.

On 7 October, East Bengal started their campaign with a 3–1 defeat against the runners-up of last season Kerala Blasters at the Jawaharlal Nehru Stadium in Kochi. Adrián Luna scored in the second half in the seventy-second minute to put the home team ahead and then Ivan Kalyuzhnyi scored in the eighty-second minute to double the lead for Kerala. Alex Lima reduced the margin for East Bengal in the eighty-seventh minute but Kalyuzhnyi scored again just two minutes later as East Bengal suffered a defeat in the opening match. East Bengal faced Goa on 12 October at home in the Salt Lake Stadium in their second match and suffered a 1–2 defeat courtesy of an injury time winner from Edu Bedia. Brandon Fernandes opened the scoring for Goa in the eighth minute while Cleiton Silva had equalized for East Bengal from a penalty in the sixty-fourth minute. On 20 October, East Bengal registered their first win of the campaign as they defeated NorthEast United 1–3 away at the Indira Gandhi Athletic Stadium in Guwahati. Cleiton Silva opened the scoring for East Bengal in the eleventh minute, Charalambos Kyriakou scored the second in the fifty-second minute, Jordan O'Doherty scored the third in the eighty-fourth minute while Matt Derbyshire scored one for NorthEast United in the injury time to reduce the margin only as a consolation, as East Bengal secured their first three points. On 29 October, East Bengal faced ATK Mohun Bagan in their fourth match at the Salt Lake Stadium in the first leg of the Kolkata Derby and suffered a 2–0 defeat. Hugo Boumous scored the first for ATK Mohun Bagan in the fifty-sixth minute and Manvir Singh scored the second in the sixty-fifth minute, as East Bengal suffered their third loss in the campaign.

On 4 November, East Bengal faced Chennaiyin at the Salt Lake Stadium and suffered a 1–0 defeat. Vafa Hakhamaneshi scored the only goal of the match in the sixty-ninth minute of the game with a header from inside the box from a corner-kick, as East Bengal suffered their fourth defeat in five matches in the league. Vafa of Chennaiyin and Sarthak Golui of East Bengal were given marching orders in the second half after both received double bookings in the match. On 11 November, East Bengal secured their second win of the campaign as they defeated Bengaluru 1–0 away at the Sree Kanteerava Stadium with Cleiton Silva scoring the only goal of the match in the sixty-ninth minute, as East Bengal moved to the eighth place with six points in six matches. Coach Stephen Constantine dedicated the win to late East Bengal fan Joy Shankar Saha who passed away during the match against ATK Mohun Bagan on 29 October. On 18 November, East Bengal faced Odisha at the Salt Lake Stadium and suffered a 4–2 defeat. East Bengal lead 2–0 at halftime after Semboi Haokip and Naorem Mahesh Singh had scored for the team but Odisha rallied from behind in the second half to score four goals, Pedro Martín scored twice, Jerry Mawihmingthanga scored the third and Nandhakumar Sekar scored the fourth as East Bengal suffered their fifth defeat of the campaign. On 27 November 2022, East Bengal registered their third victory of the campaign as they defeated Jamshedpur 3–1 away at the JRD Tata Sports Complex in Jamshedpur. V. P. Suhair scored the opener in just ninety-three seconds, scoring the fastest goal of the season while Cleiton Silva scored a brace, with all three goals being assisted by Naorem Mahesh Singh, who became the first Indian player to do so in the Indian Super League; Jay Emmanuel-Thomas scored the only goal for Jamshedpur from the spot.

On 9 December, East Bengal faced the defending champions Hyderabad at the G. M. C. Balayogi Athletic Stadium and suffered a 2–0 defeat. Mohammad Yasir scored the opening goal in the thirty-eighth minute for Hyderabad and Javier Siverio scored the second in the eighty-fifth minute to double the lead as East Bengal suffered their sixth defeat of the campaign. On 16 December, East Bengal faced Mumbai City at the Salt Lake Stadium and suffered a 3–0 defeat. Lalengmawia Ralte scored twice and Greg Stewart scored the other as East Bengal suffered their seventh defeat of the campaign. On 25 December, East Bengal announced that defender Lalchungnunga who was on loan from Sreenidi Deccan, has been signed permanently until 2026. On 30 December, East Bengal faced Bengaluru at the Salt Lake Stadium and won 2–0 with Cleiton Silva scoring a brace including an injury time winner at the ninety-third minute from thirty-five yards with a free-kick. Cleiton Silva opened the scoring in the thirty-ninth minute with a penalty but Javi Hernández equalized for Bengaluru in the fifty-fifth minute. Cleiton scored the winner late in the game as East Bengal won their fourth match of the campaign and completed a league double over Bengaluru this season.

On 7 January, East Bengal faced Odisha away at the Kalinga Stadium in Bhubaneshwar and lost 3–1. Cleiton Silva opened the scoring for East Bengal in the tenth minute but Odisha rallied from behind to score three goals, with Diego Maurício grabbing a brace and Nandhakumar Sekar scoring the other as East Bengal suffered their eighth defeat of the campaign. On 9 January, East Bengal was imposed another transfer ban by FIFA, in effect from 1 January 2023, for the non-payment of dues for Iranian forward Omid Singh. On 13 January, East Bengal faced Jamshedpur at the Salt Lake Stadium and lost 2–1. Cleiton Silva scored for East Bengal to give the lead in the first half but Harry Sawyer and Ritwik Das scored for Jamshedpur in the second half as East Bengal suffered back-to-back defeats. On 20 January, East Bengal faced Hyderabad at the Salt Lake Stadium and suffered a 2–0 defeat. Javier Siverio and Aaren D'Silva scored for Hyderabad as East Bengal lost their third consecutive game. On 26 January, the imposed transfer ban was lifted by FIFA after the club cleared off the dues for Omid Singh and they received a no-objection-certificate from the player. On 26 January, East Bengal faced Goa away at the Fatorda Stadium and suffered a 4–2 defeat. Iker Guarrotxena scored a hattrick and Brandon Fernandes scored the fourth for Goa while V.P. Suhair and Sarthak Golui reduced the margin for East Bengal as they suffered their fourth defeat in succession. On 27 January, East Bengal announced the signing of English forward Jake Jervis as a replacement for Eliandro.

On 3 February, East Bengal faced Kerala Blasters at the Salt Lake Stadium and won 1–0 courtesy of the solitary goal by Cleiton Silva, who scored his tenth goal of the campaign and helped East Bengal pick up their fifth win in the Indian Super League season. On 8 February 2023, East Bengal faced NorthEast United at the Salt Lake Stadium and drew 3–3 to grab their first draw of the season. Cleiton Silva scored a brace and Jake Jervis scored one for East Bengal while Parthib Sundar Gogoi, Jithin M. S. and Imran Khan scored for NorthEast United. On 13 February, East Bengal faced Chennaiyin away at the Jawaharlal Nehru Stadium in Chennai and lost 2–0. Lalchungnunga scored an own goal while Rahim Ali scored the second for Chennaiyin as East Bengal suffered their twelfth defeat of the campaign. On 19 February, East Bengal faced the Shield Champions Mumbai City at the Mumbai Football Arena and won 1–0 with Naorem Mahesh Singh scoring the solitary goal of the match in the fifty-second minute as East Bengal grabbed their sixth win of the campaign and reached nineteen points, the highest ever for East Bengal in the Indian Super League since their debut in 2020. On 25 February, East Bengal faced ATK Mohun Bagan in the last match of the campaign and suffered a 2–0 defeat. Slavko Damjanović and Dimitri Petratos scored for ATK Mohun Bagan as East Bengal suffered their thirteenth defeat and finished the season in the ninth position with nineteen points.

League table

Result summary

Results by match

Matches 
The league fixtures were announced on 1 September 2022, with the season starting on 7 October.

Super Cup

East Bengal along with the other ten Indian Super League teams and nine I-League teams will participate in the Super Cup, which will be held in Kerala in April 2023. The fixtures were announced on 7 March 2023 and East Bengal was grouped in Group B alongside Indian Super League sides – Hyderabad, Odisha and an I-League who would win the qualifier 3 to be contested between TRAU and Rajasthan United. The group stage matches for Group B would be played at the Payyanad Stadium in Manjeri, Kerala.

Group stage

Matches 
The fixtures were announced on 7 March 2023.

Calcutta Football League

East Bengal will be participating in the 2022-23 Calcutta Premier Division after being absent last year due to issues with their previous investor group. East Bengal will start their campaign from the super six stages of the Premier A division, along with the other big two ATK Mohun Bagan and Mohammedan Sporting. Bhawanipore, Aryan and Kidderpore are the other three teams who qualified for the super six stages. The fixtures for the Super-Six were released on 21 September and East Bengal is set to begin their campaign against Aryan on 25 September at the Bankimanjali Stadium at Naihati. ATK Mohun Bagan withdrew their name from the tournament, while East Bengal fielded their Reserve squad for the tournament as the fixtures got clashed with the Indian Super League.

On 25 September, East Bengal began their campaign with a 0–0 draw against Kidderpore at the Bankimanjali Stadium at Naihati. Bino George took charge of the team from the sidelines as the reserve squad took the field. East Bengal was supposed to play their second match against Aryan on 28 September at Naihati but the match was abandoned due to heavy rainfalls. The match was rescheduled and was played at the same venue on 15 October. East Bengal drew the match 1–1 with Jesin TK scoring in the thirty-ninth minute for East Bengal while Amarnath Baskey equalised for Aryan in the fifty-first minute as East Bengal settle for another draw. On 26 October, East Bengal faced Bhawanipore and suffered a 2–0 defeat at the Kalyani Stadium. Jiten Murmu and Gnohere Krizo scored for Bhawanipore. On 30 October, Mohammedan Sporting were crowned the champions of the tournament, even before the game against East Bengal, after Bhawanipore drew 1–1 with Aryan. On 1 November, East Bengal faced Mohammedan Sporting at the Kishore Bharati Krirangan and drew 1–1 as they ended the Calcutta Football League campaign without a win in the fourth position. Vivek Singh opened the scoring for East Bengal in the thirty-fourth minute but Faslu Rahman equalized for Mohammedan in the ninetieth minute as the game ended in a stalemate.

League table

Results by match

Matches 
The league fixtures were announced on 21 September 2022.

Statistics

Appearances
Players with no appearances are not included in the list.

Goal Scorers

Assists

Clean Sheets

Disciplinary Record

Club awards

ISL Fans' Goal of the Week award 
This is awarded weekly to the player chosen by fans voting on the Indian Super League website.

ISL Emerging Player of the Month award 
This is awarded to the best young player in the Indian Super League every month.

See also
 2022–23 in Indian football

Notes

References

External links
 Official website 

East Bengal Club seasons
East Bengal FC